is a Shintō-derived religious movement headquartered in the town of Hiranai in Aomori Prefecture, Japan.

History
Shōroku Shintō Yamatoyama originates from Tazawa Seishirō's dedication of a shrine in 1919 to a Yama-no-Kami after he witnessed extraordinary astronomical phenomena and heard divine voices; however, he officially began the organization in January 1930. It established its headquarters at an isolated tract of land in the mountains of Hiranai in 1969. By 1999 the sect had garnered over 60 thousand adherents, primarily from Hokkaido and the Tōhoku region.

A private school run by the movement gained national attention for its use of the deprecated Imperial Rescript on Education in its curriculum. A part of the group's headquarters burned down on 21 March 2021.

Theology
Shōroku Shintō Yamatoyama is a Shintō-derived religious movement that has been strongly influenced by Oomoto and Augustinianism.

References

External links
Shōroku Shintō Yamatoyama (Official website)

Japanese new religions
Shinto new religious movements
Religious organizations based in Japan
Hiranai, Aomori